Dónde Están los Ladrones? is the fourth studio album by Colombian singer and songwriter Shakira, released on 29 September 1998 by Columbia Records and Sony Music Latin. After attaining success in Latin America with her major-label debut, Pies Descalzos (1995), Shakira met producer Emilio Estefan, who identified her potential to break into the US Latin market and became her manager. As co-producer, Shakira enlisted previous collaborator Luis Fernando Ochoa along with Pablo Flores, Javier Garza, Lester Mendez, and Estefan, who executive produced the album. Its music incorporates Latin pop styles, additionally experimenting with rock en español and Middle Eastern music sounds.

Upon its release, Dónde Están los Ladrones? received positive reviews from music critics, who praised its sound and lyrics, with one reviewer comparing Shakira to Alanis Morissette. Commercially, the album was a success, being certified in several regions including Shakira's native Colombia, where it was certified triple-platinum. Additionally, the album peaked at number 131 on the US Billboard 200, and topped the Top Latin and Latin Pop Albums charts. The album received numerous record certifications in various countries, including a Platinum certification in the United States by the Recording Industry Association of America (RIAA). Dónde Están los Ladrones? won several accolades, and was nominated for Grammy Award for Best Latin Rock, Urban or Alternative Album at the 41st Grammy Awards.

Six singles were released from Dónde Están los Ladrones?. Its lead single, "Ciega, Sordomuda", reached the top of both Billboards Hot Latin and Latin Pop Songs component charts, and also reached number one on charts of countries in Central America and Venezuela. Follow-up singles "Tú", "Inevitable", "No Creo", "Ojos Así" and "Moscas en la Casa" peaked within the top thirty and top ten of the charts, respectively. "Dónde Están los Ladrones?", "Si Te Vas", and "Octavo Día" served as promotional singles. The album was promoted through several televised performances, including her debut on American television through The Rosie O'Donnell Show. In order to continue promoting it, along with her next release, MTV Unplugged, Shakira embarked on the Tour Anfibio, which visited North and South America throughout 2000.

Background and development

After she rose to prominence with the success of her major-label debut Pies Descalzos (1995), Shakira was introduced to Emilio Estefan, the most important producer in the Hispanic market at the time, by her promoter and longtime friend, Jairo Martínez. Estefan was renowned for launching the careers of several Hispanic singers, including Enrique Iglesias, Thalía, and his wife Gloria Estefan. He decided to work with Shakira as he identified her potential to break into the US Latin market. One of Shakira's concerns about working with Estefan was creative control over her music. Before signing their contract, the roles and duties were defined: Estefan would be her manager and executive producer, but she would be in charge of all material and arrangements and have final approval over her records. She later stated about Estefan, "He had a great respect for me as an artist and trusted me totally on this project". Since then, they started working at Estefan's Crescent Moon Studios in Miami.

Shakira was mindful of the many who would judge her fourth album, because of the "phenomenon" label recently applied to her. She knew that some would say that "she had changed too much" and others would reproach her if she remained the same. "All I could do was to be myself. I understood that all I had to do was write the music I knew how to write and to write from the heart when I was compelled to. In that way, everything developed naturally, more so than I could have imagined", she said. In addition, Shakira insisted on perfection, working on the material to the point of exhaustion. "I made two or three demos of each song. I became a human being so demanding of myself that until the song made my hair stand on end, I wouldn't stop". Equipment for the recording of Dónde Están los Ladrones? included old amplifiers to achieve a better sound, a 40-year-old German microphone, and several innovations in the instrumental mixes. Dónde Están los Ladrones? took nine months to produce, more than her previous records since more people worked on this album. Shakira commented, "To me it's a normal time, the gestation period for a baby. But many people wag their finger and tell me that the next one cannot take so long..."

Title and artwork

The album's title was inspired by one of Shakira's trips to the capital of her native country, Colombia. At the El Dorado International Airport in Bogotá, after finishing her Tour Pies Descalzos, part of her luggage was stolen, including a briefcase that contained all the lyrics Shakira had been working on for the album. Shakira commented, "The worst part about the whole thing was that I couldn't remember them because of the mental block that can be caused by such a traumatic experience as the robbery of such a personal item". Feelings of impotence and emptiness overcame Shakira with such violence that for a couple of days and nights she thought of nothing but the people who had taken her material. She could not stop thinking about them: "Who are they? What are they looking for? Where are they?". She searched for a reason behind the theft of her songs. "I came to the conclusion that there are all types of thieves. A thief is not just a person who takes a physical object that doesn't belong to him or her. There are thieves who steal feelings, space, time, dreams, rights", she explained.

The album's title also evolves into a reference to the political corruption and general social mistrust pervading contemporary Colombian society. The album cover features a photo of her, soot-covered palms up, caught with her hands dirty. Shakira explained the cover, saying, "[f]rom that point of view, we all have stolen at one time or another, myself included. The dirty hands [on the cover of her album] represent the shared guilt. No one is completely clean, in the end we are all accomplices". In keeping with her increasingly rocker sound, for this album she left her hair loose and messy and filled it up with little colorful braids, looking like a "modern Medusa" according to biographer Ximena Diego. Following the album's commercial success, girls from several countries were copying Shakira's style, colorfully braiding their hair and wearing friendship bracelets.

Composition

Dónde Están los Ladrones? consists of Latin pop and rock en español styles. The album opens with "Ciega, Sordomuda", which is musically filled by typical Mexican trumpets over a disco dance loop and an electric guitar. Second track "Si Te Vas" lyrically depicts an angry Shakira who tells her lover "". The next song, "Moscas en la Casa", was inspired by the singer's troubled relationship with Puerto Rican actor Osvaldo Ríos. Shakira lyrically expresses the sadness that she feels after a broken relationship. "", she sings. In the next track "No Creo", the singer expresses how she believes in nothing and nobody except her lover. The song references popular socially accepted or non-accepted norms such as herself, luck, Karl Marx, Jean-Paul Sartre, Venus and Mars, and Brian Weiss. The fifth song on Dónde Están los Ladrones? is "Inevitable". Lyrically, in the hard rock ballad, Shakira confesses that she does not know how to prepare coffee, does not understand football, that she must have been unfaithful at some point and that she never wears a watch. The next track "Octavo Día" is a rock-oriented song that refers to God coming to Earth after finishing his work and discovering everything to be in ruins, and decides to quit his job and become a normal man. She also namechecks Bill Clinton and Michael Jackson.

Seventh song "Que Vuelvas" is another song inspired by her relationship with Ríos. It was musically compared to Shakira's past single "Estoy Aquí" (1996). The following track, "Tú", lyrically expresses the sweetness of love, with Shakira singing: "" and "". The ninth song is "Dónde Están los Ladrones?", a guitar-driven song which criticizes the politic and social reality in South American nations at the time of the album's release. She sings, "". Finally, she sentences the aristocracy singing, "". The following track on Dónde Están los Ladrones? is "Sombra de Ti". During the song, Shakira remembers a past love, singing, "". The album's closing song "Ojos Así" is accompanied by a "Lambadalike middle eastern rhythm". Containing a verse in Arabic, lyrically Shakira laments that even though she has traveled from Bahrain to Beirut, she has never found eyes like her lover has.

Singles
"Ciega, Sordomuda" was released on 7 September 1998 as the album's lead single. It reached number one in Shakira's native Colombia less than a week after its release, becoming the fastest pop song to do so there. It also reached number one on charts of countries in Central America, Venezuela and the United States. The music video for the song was directed by Gustavo Garzón. In it, Shakira is arrested along with many other people, and escapes with the help of her love interest who later dresses as a policeman. Shakira hides in a wig store, pretending to be a mannequin, and drives a car blindfolded while the whole city searches for her, blindfolded as well. It was nominated for a Lo Nuestro Award for Video of the Year in 1999. "Tú" was selected as the second single from the album. It repeated the success of the previous single, reaching the top positions on both the US Latin Pop Songs and Hot Latin Songs charts. The black-and-white music video for the single was directed by Emilio Estefan in Orlando, Florida. "Inevitable" was released as the album's third single. In the music video directed by Garzón, Shakira sings the song to an audience in a circular stage. The single was also a success, reaching numbers two and three on the US Latin Pop Songs and Hot Latin Songs charts.

"No Creo" was released as the fourth single from Dónde Están los Ladrones?, and was also a commercial success, reaching numbers two and nine on the US Latin Pop Songs and Hot Latin Songs charts, respectively. The song received two music videos: the first was the performance from the MTV Unplugged album and the second was also directed by Gustavo Garzón. "Ojos Así" was released as the album's fifth single. The track reached numbers nine and twenty-two on the US Latin Pop Songs and Hot Latin Songs component charts, respectively. The music video for "Ojos Así" features Shakira performing the song for a crowd, with a giant neon eye in the background, which shoots out sparks and catches fire towards the end of the video. There are also scenes of Shakira belly dancing in front of a dark purple background, with snakes painted down her arms and red lines painted on her head. The video won the International Viewer's Choice Award (North) at the 2000 MTV Video Music Awards, while it was also nominated for the same award in the South category and for a Latin Grammy Award for Best Short Form Music Video. "Moscas en la Casa" was released as the sixth single from Dónde Están los Ladrones? It peaked at numbers ten and twenty-five on the US Latin Pop Songs and Hot Latin Songs charts, respectively. "Dónde Están los Ladrones?", "Si Te Vas", and "Octavo Día" served as promotional singles.

Critical reception

Dónde Están los Ladrones? received critical acclaim from music critics. Alex Henderson from AllMusic gave the album four and a half stars out of five, saying that the album was "arguably the finest and most essential album that she recorded in the 1990s" and also stated that besides its lyrics, the album would impress even non-Spanish-speaking listeners with its "attractive melodies and the emotion that the artist brings to her songs". He finished his review saying, "if you're acquiring your first Shakira release, this would be the ideal choice". Billboard magazine was also positive and called it a "like-minded set brimming with forlorn, lovesick testimonials set to a mainstream pop/rock sound laced occasionally with edgy guitar and vocal interludes", picking the song "Ojos Así" as the "most satisfying" track on the album. Christopher John Farley, while reviewing positively Dónde Están los Ladrones? in his Time magazine review, said that the buzz around Shakira was justified. "On her latest CD she charges Latin pop with rock 'n' roll to thrilling effect. Even when her music gets loud, Shakira's vibrant contralto remains sweet and expressive. [...] Missing out on this collection would be at least a misdemeanor", he completed. Mark Kemp, writing for the book The New Rolling Stone Album Guide, said that the album mined a familiar territory in Shakira's music, but it "holds together with stronger songs, a beefier sound, and more confident vocals". He finished his review by saying that it was "hard to imagine a singer barely into her 20s having written and recorded such an inventive set of songs", while complimenting Estefan's production, calling it "surprisingly tasteful and evenhanded".

A reviewer from MTV said that "Latin pop innovator Shakira represents the kind of eventuality for which Alanis Morissette, Bob Dylan and Beck are all precedents", but also noted that "Those expecting polite recreations of Latin styles past will be sorely disappointed, but listeners for whom crossover is the norm will find a wealth of satisfaction in Donde Estan los Ladrones, whether or not they understand the words". Leila Cobo Hanlon from Miami Herald was positive, saying that the album "retains Shakira's trademark sound — rock-laced pop melodies backed by acoustic guitars — as well as her deeply personal approach to music-making", but also noting that "ironically, the album's only failures occur when it looks too closely at its predecessor". Sputnikmusic website gave a positive review saying "¿Dónde Están Los Ladrones? is the gem of Shakira's discography, and one of the best Spanish pop releases of the past decade", although criticized its "slight lack of variety". Franz Reynold from Latin Beat Magazine noted that "while many of the cuts on this collection are definitely chart-bound, that is due more to the fact that she doesn't stray too far from the previous formula, than it does to any hope that success provides room for expansion", but complimented tracks like "Inevitable" and "Tú". Rubens Herbst from Brazilian newspaper A Notícia gave a mixed review, writing that the album was "homogenous, well-produced and full of potential hits", but "empty and forgettable, like every FM pop — and the fact of singing in Spanish doesn't take Shakira away from the label". In July 2017, the album ranked at number 95 on the list for the 150 greatest female albums of all time by the National Public Radio.

Accolades
At the 41st Annual Grammy Awards in 1999, Dónde Están Los Ladrones? received a nomination for Best Latin Rock/Alternative Album, which went to Sueños Líquidos by Maná. At the 11th Annual Lo Nuestro Awards in the same year, the recording won the Lo Nuestro Award for Pop Album of the Year in a tie with Sueños Líquidos. At the 1999 Billboard Latin Music Award, it won Pop Album of the Year by a Female Artist, and El Premio de la Gente for Female Pop Artist or Group at the Ritmo Latino Music Awards in the same year. Dónde Están los Ladrones? won in the category of Best Pop Album by a Female Artist at the 1999 Premios Globo. The record was recognized as Latin Album of the Year at the 2000 Premios Gardel. In the updated edition for The 500 Greatest Albums of All Time published in 2020 by American magazine Rolling Stone, the album ranked at number 496 and is described as a "stellar globetrotting dance-rock set, which blends sounds from Colombia, Mexico, and her father’s native Lebanon."

Commercial performance

Dónde Están los Ladrones? sold 300,000 copies on the day of its release, and over one million copies by the end of its first month of release. On the US Billboard 200, the album debuted at number 141 for the week dated 17 October 1998, selling 10,500 units, 75% up in comparison to its previous week, when it did not sell enough to debut on the chart. The next week it climbed to its peak of number 131, after a 10% increase in sales. In addition, it reached number one on Top Latin Albums, Latin Pop Albums, and number 30 on Catalog Albums component charts. In December 1998, it was revealed that the album had reached 500,000 copies sold in the United States and 1.5 million worldwide. It was certified platinum by the Recording Industry Association of America (RIAA), recognizing a million shipments within the country. , the album sold over 920,000 copies in the US, making it the ninth bestselling Latin album in the country according to Nielsen SoundScan.

Across Europe, Dónde Están los Ladrones? made appearances on the lower end of music charts. In Germany, the album entered the Offizielle Top 100 albums chart at number 99 in the issue dated 11 February 2002. It finally peaked at number 79 weeks later, spending a total of nine weeks on the chart. In Netherlands, the album had a similar debut, at number 99 on 20 April 2002, falling out of the chart the next week. Two months later, it returned to the charts at number 88. After falling out of the chart one more time, the album returned to number 88 on 17 August 2002 and peaking at number 78 the week after. Dónde Están los Ladrones? debuted at number 89 in March 2002, and reached number 73 in late April. The album remained five weeks on the chart in total.

In Hispanic countries, the album was a success. In Shakira's native Colombia, it was certified triple-platinum by the Asociación Colombiana de Productores de Fonogramas (ASINCOL) after selling 180,000 copies within the country. The album was also certified triple-platinum in Chile and Venezuela, double-platinum in Mexico and Uruguay, quadruple-platinum in Argentina, and platinum in Spain. Dónde Están los Ladrones? sold over 4 million copies worldwide.

Legacy 

According to music journalist Sebastián Peña from Shock magazine, the record was intended to surpass the success, quality and attention that Shakira had achieved with her previous album, something that she undoubtedly achieved. He added that Shakira dared to do something that very few artists of that time they had done for the fear of not playing on the radio, saying many things, criticizing the corrupt and those who live their lives superficially, achieving in several words to be revolutionary for that decade. Back then, when a new stream of Latin artists were taking off like Carolina Sabino, none managed to transcend with a well-established fan base, something that Shakira did. The singer was also credited with opening new doors for women in the industry and showed to people that she could become a "superhero" for men and women, despite the fact that female artists always had them in the background. She was seen by the media as the Latin Alanis Morissette due to their similarity in their way of expressing themselves and their visual proposal, and thanks to this album Shakira managed to give greater strength and visibility to the international female boom at the end of the first millennium. The album led Shakira to be dubbed by Time magazine as "The princess of rock" and to be described as "The Colombian Artist of the millennium" in her country.

According to Ximena Diego's book Shakira: Mujer Full of Grace, Shakira's style on her album and more specifically the video "Ciega, Sordomuda" became a trend in several young women of the time; various teenage girls imitated the outfit and accessories that the singer used during the time, thousands of letters reached her from fans, her music sounded in different children's toys around the country even establishing the bases to take Latin music to totally foreign cultures such as European and Asian. Rolling Stone credits Shakira with redefining Latin music with her first two albums, being Dónde Están los Ladrones? the album that changed the rules of rock en español, laying the foundation for future Latin rockers also introduced her to the American public and made her a household name in Latin rock. According to the same magazine, female artists such as Francisca Valenzuela and Jessie Reyez explained in interviews about the lyrics of love and heartbreak that in their words this album inspired a whole generation of women to write their own songs without "apologizing". It was also considered the most influential album among women and the LGBT community according to a survey.

Dónde Están los Ladrones? is considered a benchmark for a whole generation of young Latin artists. Sebastián Yatra, Francisca Valenzuela and Camilo all have cited it as a point of inspiration for their musical works. In 2020, it was selected as one of the 500 greatest albums of all time by Rolling Stone, being one of the few Latin and the only rock in Spanish on the list. In July 2017, the album ranked at number 95 on the list for the 150 greatest female albums of all time by the National Public Radio. Dónde Están los Ladrones? was included as one of the "1000 Recordings You Must Hear Before You Die" by Sony Music.

Promotion

Promotion for Dónde Están los Ladrones? began when Shakira performed its lead single "Ciega, Sordomuda" on the Con T de Tarde show in Spain, in September 1998. In October, Shakira traveled to Brazil and was featured in many TV programs, including Domingo Legal on SBT, which she appeared twice. On 28 January 1999, Shakira made her debut on American television by appearing on The Rosie O'Donnell Show. Gloria Estefan introduced and interviewed the singer instead of O'Donnell, before she performed an English version of "Inevitable", which she sang while suffering from fever due to nervousness. In February 1999, she went to Peru to perform on Laura TV show. Shakira also sang "Inevitable" in a medley with "Come to My Window" with singer Melissa Etheridge on the ALMA Awards on 6 March 1999. During a promotional tour she returned to Brazil in March 1999, and performed on several TV shows such as Domingão do Faustão. In May, she returned to the United States to perform at the Premio Lo Nuestro 1999 in Miami, and at the Cinco de Mayo Festival in Los Angeles. In November, Shakira sang at the Premios Amigo in Spain, while she also performed on the Miss Colombia 1999 election, closing the event. Shakira performed "Ojos Así" on the first-ever Latin Grammy Awards on September 13, 2000, giving a "wildly" choreographed performance against a backdrop of tiki torches and images of water as she writhed about in a red pantsuit.

In order to promote the album and MTV Unplugged, Shakira embarked on the Tour Anfibio which began on 17 March 2000 in Panama City, Panama, and ended on 12 May 2000 in Buenos Aires, Argentina. It was sponsored by Nokia. The name "anfibio" was chosen by Shakira for its resemblance with her: earthy, viscerally connected to the water element, capable of adapting and willing to undergo metamorphosis. Shakira said about the tour's name: "You'll have to find out. It's an invitation for you to watch the show and find out. It has nothing to do with past performances. You'll see an evolved and renewed Shakira. It's a spectacle of many transformations that will prevent the public from getting bored". The tour's setlist consisted of songs from her albums Pies Descalzos and Dónde Están los Ladrones? In addition, she included an a capella song, "Alfonsina y el Mar", originally by Argentine folk singer Mercedes Sosa. Criticism of the tour included the high ticket prices, overselling of tickets in Guatemala, which according to the press could have caused a tragedy, the long delays at the start of the show and its short duration, and the accusation of the use of pre-recorded music in Puerto Rico. Despite the criticism, the tour was a financial success, earning Shakira a position in the list of Top 50 Tours published in the summer of 2000 by Pollstar magazine.

English version
The success of Dónde Están los Ladrones? prompted American singer Gloria Estefan, Emilio Estefan's wife, to persuade Shakira to record the album in English and attempt to cross over into the mainstream pop industry. However, Shakira was initially hesitant to record songs in English as it was not her first language, so she offered to translate "Ojos Así" into English in order to show her that "it could translate well". Shakira then began translating the song herself and showed it to Gloria Estefan, and would say, "Quite honestly, I can't do this better!." As Shakira wanted to have full control over her recordings, she decided to learn English better to enable her to write her own songs. She was supposed to return to studio to record an English version of the album in January 1999. It did not came to fruition, and a new album titled Laundry Service was released instead as her first crossover album.

Track listing
All lyrics written by Shakira Mebarak.

Personnel
Credits adapted from the liner notes of Dónde Están los Ladrones?.

 Shakira – producer, songwriter, vocals, harmonica
 Emilio Estefan Jr. – executive producer
 Javier Garza – producer, engineer, mixer, programmer
 Luis Fernando Ochoa – producer, songwriter, guitar, bass guitar
 Lester Mendez – producer, string arrangements, programming, keyboards
 Pablo Flores – producer, programmer
 Sebastian Krys – engineer, mixer
 Steve Menezes – assistant engineer
 Alfred Figueroa – assistant engineer
 Kieran Wagner – assistant engineer
 Chris Wiggins – assistant engineer
 Bob Ludwig - Mastering
 Kevin Dillon – coordinator
 Wendy Pedersen – backing vocals
 Adam Zimmon – guitar
 Marcelo Acevedo – guitar
 Randy Barlow – accordion
 Teddy Mulet – trumpet
 Brendan Buckley – drums
 Edwin Bonilla – percussion
 John Falcone – electric bass guitar

Charts

Weekly charts

Year-end charts

Certifications and sales

See also
1998 in Latin music
List of number-one Billboard Top Latin Albums from the 1990s
List of number-one Billboard Latin Pop Albums from the 1990s
List of best-selling albums in Argentina
List of best-selling albums in Chile
List of best-selling albums in Colombia
List of best-selling albums in Mexico
List of best-selling Latin albums
List of best-selling Latin albums in the United States

Footnotes

References

1998 albums
Albums produced by Emilio Estefan
Sony Music Latin albums
Shakira albums
Spanish-language albums
Dance-rock albums